Nationality words link to articles with information on the nation's poetry or literature (for instance, Irish or France).

Events

June 29 – T. S. Eliot enters the Church of England; in November he takes British citizenship.
July 7 – James Joyce's collection Pomes Penyeach is published by Shakespeare and Company in Paris.
August – T. S. Eliot's poem Journey of the Magi is published in Faber and Gwyer's Ariel poems series (London) illustrated by E. McKnight Kauffer.

Works published

Canada
Alfred Bailey, Songs of the Saguenay and other poems.
 Wilson MacDonald, An Ode On The Diamond Jubilee Of Confederation. Toronto: W. MacDonald.
E. J. Pratt, The Iron Door: An Ode, Toronto: Macmillan.
Charles G.D. Roberts, The Vagrant of Time. (Toronto: Ryerson).

India in English
 Swami Ananda Acharya:
 Sara and other poems (Poetry in English), Roros, Norway: Odegards Trykkeri 106 pages
 Arctic Swallows (Poetry in English) 
 Harindranath Chattopadhyaya, Collected Plays and Poems, 44 sonnets Madras: printed at Hogarth Press
 Joseph Furtado, A Goan Fiddler (Poetry in English)
 Peroze P. Meherjee, Poems in Prose (Poetry in English), London: Luzac and Co., posthumously published (died 1925)
 Gwendoline Goodwin, editor, An Anthology of Modern Indian Poetry, London: John Murray; anthology (Poetry in English), published in the United Kingdom

Ireland
 James Joyce, Pomes Penyeach, published in Paris
 W.B. Yeats:
 October Blast, including "Among School Children", published in the United Kingdom
 Stories of Red Hanrahan and the Secret Rose, poetry and fiction

United Kingdom
 G. K. Chesterton, Collected Poems
 Joe Corrie, The Image o' God and Other Poems, Scottish poet
 W. H. Davies, A Poet's Calendar
 T. S. Eliot
 Journey of the Magi
 "Salutation" (later to become part II of Ash Wednesday, published in 1930) is published in December in Saturday Review of Literature; also published in January 1928 in Eliot's own Criterion magazine
 Gwendoline Goodwin, editor, An Anthology of Modern Indian Poetry, London: John Murray; anthology; Indian poetry in English, published in the United Kingdom
 Robert Graves, Poems 1914–26
 Teresa Hooley, Songs of All Seasons
 Violet Jacob, The Northern Lights and other poems, Scottish poet
 A. A. Milne, Now We are Six
 William Plomer, Notes for Poems
 Edith Sitwell, Rustic Elegies
 Osbert Sitwell, England Reclaimed
 Iris Tree, The Traveller and other Poems
 Humbert Wolfe
 Cursory Rhymes
 Requiem
 W.B. Yeats
 October Blast, including "Among School Children", Irish poet published in the United Kingdom
 Stories of Red Hanrahan and the Secret Rose, poetry and fiction

United States
 Sherwood Anderson, A New Testament
 Countee Cullen, Copper Sun
 Donald Davidson, The Tall Men
 Langston Hughes, Fine Clothes to the Jew
 Robinson Jeffers, The Women at Point Sur
 James Weldon Johnson:
 God's Trombones
 God's Promises
 Amy Lowell, Ballads for Sale
 John Livingston Lowes, The Road to Xanadu, a book on the composition of Samuel Taylor Coleridge's "Kubla Khan" (scholarship)
 Don Marquis, archy and mehitabel, presented fictionally as a collection of vers libre poems typed by a former-poet-turned-cockroach who jumps on the keys of a typewriter
 Alice Dunbar Nelson, Caroling Dusk - a collection of African-American poets
 Charles Reznikoff, Five Groups of Verse self-published in 375 copies and containing material from his earlier "Uriel Accosta: A Play" and A Fourth Group of Verse (1921)

Other in English
 Shaw Neilson, New Poems, Sydney, Bookfellow, Australia

Works published in other languages

France
 Guillaume Apollinaire, pen name of Wilhelm Apollinaris de Kostrowitzky, Julie; ou, La Rose, posthumously published (died 1918)
 Jean Cocteau, Opéra, Oeuvres poétiques
 Robert Desnos, La liberté ou l'amour! ("Liberty or Love!")
 Henri Michaux, Qui je fus("Who I Was"), Paris: N.R.D.
 Charles Vildrac, Prolongements, France

Indian subcontinent
Including all of the British colonies that later became India, Pakistan, Bangladesh, Sri Lanka and Nepal. Listed alphabetically by first name, regardless of surname:

Bengali
 Jibanananda Das, Jhara Palak, the author's first book of poems; Bengali
 Mohitlal Majumdar, Bismarani, Bengali
 Yatindranath Sengupta, Marusikha, Bengali

Other Indian languages
 Bhai Vir Singh, Bijalian De Har, short poems, mostly lyrical and didactic, Punjabi
 Muhammad Iqbal, Zabur-i-Ajam ("Persian Psalms") including the poems "Gulshan-i Raz-i Jadid" ("New Garden of Secrets") and "Bandagi Nama" ("Book of Slavery"), India
 Yaganab Changezi and Mirza Yas (writing under the pen name "Husain"), Ayat-i Vijdani, Urdu
 Keshavlal Dhruv, ed., Pandarma Shatakna Prachin Gurjar Kavyo, compilation of 15th-century Gujarati poems
 Ratnahas, Harishchandrakhyan, translated by Keshavlal Dhruv

Spanish language

Peru
 Carlos Oquendo de Amat, 5 metros de poemas ("5 Meters of Poems")

Spain
 Rafael Alberti, El alba del alheli (1925–1926) ("The Dawn of the Wallflower")
 Luis Cernuda, Perfil del aire ("Profile of Air", which later appeared as Primeras poesías ["First Poems"] in the author's complete works, La realidad y el deseo ["Reality and Desire"])
 Federico García Lorca, Canciones ("Songs")
 Miguel de Unamuno, Romancero del destierro ("Ballads of Exile")

Other languages
 Vladislav Khodasevich, European Night, Russian poet published in Germany
 Hendrik Marsman, Paradise Regained, Netherlands

Awards and honors
 Newdigate Prize: G. E. Trevelyan, Julia, Daughter of Claudius (first female winner)
 Pulitzer Prize for Poetry: Leonora Speyer, Fiddler's Farewell

Births
Death years link to the corresponding "[year] in poetry" article:
 January 8 – Charles Tomlinson (died 2015), English poet, translator, academic and artist
 February 1 – Galway Kinnell (died 2014), American poet
 February 16 – Pearse Hutchinson (died 2012), Scottish-born Irish poet, broadcaster and translator
 April 7 – Giampiero Neri, born Giampietro Pontiggia (died 2023), Italian poet
 April 8
 Judson Jerome (died 1991), American poet
 Phyllis Webb, Canadian poet and radio broadcaster
 April 12 – Don Coles (died 2017), Canadian poet
 June 7 – Martin Carter (died 1997), Guyanese poet
 June 8 – George Lamming (died 2022), Barbadian poet
 June 20 – Simin Behbahani (died 2014), Persian poet
 June 26 – Robert Kroetsch (died 2011), Canadian poet and novelist
 July 9 – David Diop (died 1960), French Senegalese poet
 July 22 – John Tripp (died 1986), Anglo-Welsh poet in whose memory the annual John Tripp Spoken Poetry Award is presented
 July 28 – John Ashbery (died 2017), American poet, chancellor of the American Academy of Arts and Letters and winner of the Pulitzer Prize for Poetry
 August 6 – Richard Murphy, Irish-born poet
 August 7 – Larry Eigner (died 1996), American poet, early in his career associated with the Black Mountain poets; later recognized as precursor to other poetic movements, e.g., Language poetry
 August 15 – Patrick Galvin (died 2011), Irish poet and dramatist
 September 7 – Molly Holden (died 1981), English poet
 September 20 – Elisabet Hermodsson (died 2017), Swedish poet and artist
 September 30 – W. S. Merwin (died 2019), American poet, winner of the Pulitzer Prize for Poetry
 October 16 – Günter Grass (died 2015), German author and poet, winner of the Nobel Prize in Literature
 October 19 – Edwin Brock (died 1997), English poet
 October 20 – Oskar Pastior (died 2006), Romanian-born German poet and translator
 November 20 – Kikuo Takano (died 2006), Japanese poet and mathematician
 December 3 – James Wright (died 1980), American poet

Deaths
Birth years link to the corresponding "[year] in poetry" article:
 January 4 – Süleyman Nazif, سلیمان نظیف (born 1870), Turkish poet and politician, pneumonia
 April 6 – Florence Earle Coates (born 1850), American poet, dies in Hahnemann Hospital, Philadelphia
 June 9 – Adolfo León Gómez (born 1857), Colombian poet
 July 5 – Lesbia Harford (born 1892), Australian poet
 July 7 – Charles Mair (born 1838), Canadian poet
 September 14 – Hugo Ball (born 1886), German Dada author and poet
 September 15 – Herman Gorter (born 1864), Dutch poet and socialist
 October 8 – Ricardo Güiraldes (born 1886), Argentine-born novelist and poet
 October 26 – Yagi Jūkichi, 八木重吉 (born 1898), Japanese poet (surname: Yagi)

See also

 Poetry
 List of poetry awards
 List of years in poetry
 New Objectivity in German literature and art
 Generation of '27 in Spanish poetry

Notes

20th-century poetry
Poetry